Markus Zimmermann (born 4 September 1964 in Berchtesgaden) is a German former bobsledder who competed from 1984 to 2004. Competing in four Winter Olympics, he won four medals with two golds (Two-man: 2002, Four-man: 1998), one silver (Two-man: 1992), and one bronze (Two-man: 1998).  He was born at Berchtesgaden, in southern Bavaria.

Zimmerman also won eight medals at the FIBT World Championships with five golds (Two-man: 1991, 1996, 2000; Four-man: 1996, 2001) and three silvers (Two-man: 1999, 2004; Four-man: 2000).

References
 Bobsleigh two-man Olympic medalists 1932-56 and since 1964
 Bobsleigh four-man Olympic medalists for 1924, 1932-56, and since 1964
 Bobsleigh two-man world championship medalists since 1931
 Bobsleigh four-man world championship medalists since 1930
 
 FIBT profile

External links
 
 
 

1964 births
Living people
German male bobsledders
People from Berchtesgaden
Sportspeople from Upper Bavaria
Bobsledders at the 1992 Winter Olympics
Bobsledders at the 1994 Winter Olympics
Bobsledders at the 1998 Winter Olympics
Bobsledders at the 2002 Winter Olympics
Olympic bobsledders of Germany
Olympic gold medalists for Germany
Olympic silver medalists for Germany
Olympic bronze medalists for Germany
Olympic medalists in bobsleigh
Medalists at the 2002 Winter Olympics
Medalists at the 1998 Winter Olympics
Medalists at the 1992 Winter Olympics